The 2013 Atlantic Hockey Tournament is the 10th Atlantic Hockey Tournament. It will be played between March 8 and March 23, 2013 at campus locations and at the Blue Cross Arena in Rochester, New York, United States. The winner of the tournament will earn Atlantic Hockey's automatic bid to the 2013 NCAA Division I Men's Ice Hockey Tournament.

Format
The tournament features four rounds of play. In the first round the fifth and twelfth, sixth and eleventh, seventh and tenth, and eighth and ninth seeds, as determined by the conference regular season standings, play a best-of-three series with the winners advancing to the quarterfinals. The top four teams from the conference regular season standings receive a bye to the quarterfinals. There, the first seed and lowest-ranked first-round winner, the second seed and second-lowest-ranked first-round winner, the third seed and second-highest-ranked first-round winner, and the fourth seed and the highest-ranked first-round winner play a best-of-three series, with the winners advancing to the semifinals. In the semifinals, the highest and lowest seeds and second-highest and second-lowest seeds play a single game, with the winner advancing to the championship game. The tournament champion receives an automatic bid to the 2013 NCAA Division I Men's Ice Hockey Tournament.

Standings
Note: GP = Games played; W = Wins; L = Losses; T = Ties; PTS = Points; GF = Goals For; GA = Goals Against

Bracket

Note: * denotes overtime period(s)

Results

First round

(5) Robert Morris vs. (12) Sacred Heart

(6) Mercyhurst vs. (11) Army

(7) Canisius vs. (10) Bentley

(8) RIT vs. (9) American International

Quarterfinals

(1) Niagara vs. (8) RIT

(2) Air Force vs. (7) Canisius

(3) Holy Cross vs. (6) Mercyhurst

(4) Connecticut vs. (5) Robert Morris

Semifinals

(1) Niagara vs. (7) Canisius

(4) Connecticut vs. (6) Mercyhurst

Championship

(6) Mercuhurst vs. (7) Canisius

Tournament awards

All-Tournament Team
G Tony Capobianco (Canisius)
D Ben Danford (Canisius)
D Nick Jones (Mercyhurst)
F Kyle Gibbons* (Canisius)
F Tyler Wiseman (Canisius)
F Paul Chiasson (Mercyhurst)
* Most Valuable Player(s)

References

Atlantic Hockey Tournament
Atlantic Hockey Tournament